Hatfield Hall may refer to:

Hatfield Hall (Cobourg), private school for girls in Cobourg, Ontario
Antoinette Hatfield Hall, theatre complex in Portland, Oregon
old name for Hatfield College, Durham
the theatre in Rose-Hulman Institute of Technology, Terre Haute, Indiana